Jack Simmons may refer to:
Jack Simmons (historian) (1915–2000), historian
Jack Simmons (American football) (1924–1978), NFL player for the Chicago Cardinals
Jack Simmons (cricketer) (born 1941), former cricketer who played for Lancashire and Tasmania
Jack Simmons (soccer) (born 2002), Australian footballer for Newcastle Jets

See also
John Simmons (disambiguation)